Zainab Momoh (born 3 November 1996) is a Nigerian badminton player. She is affiliated with Oyo State.

Career 
Momoh won the women's doubles bronze medals at the 2017 and 2018 African Championships.

Achievements

African Championships 
Women's doubles

African Youth Games 
Mixed doubles

BWF International Challenge/Series 
Women's doubles

  BWF International Challenge tournament
  BWF International Series tournament
  BWF Future Series tournament

References 

Living people
1996 births
Sportspeople from Oyo State
Nigerian female badminton players
21st-century Nigerian women